Senator Berríos may refer to:

Carmen Berríos (fl. 1990s–2000s), Senate of Puerto Rico
Rubén Berríos (born 1939), Senate of Puerto Rico